Aaron Best (born January 27, 1978) is an American football coach and former player. He is the head coach at Eastern Washington University, his alma mater, promoted from offensive coordinator in January 2017.

Playing career
Best graduated in 1996 from Curtis Senior High School in Tacoma, Washington, where he had a 3.75 grade point average. He was a co-captain his senior season as Curtis won the State 3A football championship.

Best spent four years at Eastern Washington as a long snapper and center. He started 22 straight games as a junior and senior, earning First Team All-Big Sky Conference and Honorable Mention All-American honors.

Coaching career
From 2000 to 2001, Best served as a student/graduate assistant at Eastern Washington. From 2002 to 2006, Best served as the offensive line coach, during which time he helped develop 2005 NFL Draft selection Michael Roos, who was taken in the second round by the Tennessee Titans.

In 2007, Best became the offensive line coach for the Toronto Argonauts of the Canadian Football League (CFL). The next year in 2008, Best returned to EWU as the offensive coordinator and offensive line coach under new head coach Beau Baldwin. Best was part of the coaching staff in 2010, when the Eagles won the FCS national championship.

When Baldwin left after the 2016 season to become the offensive coordinator at California, Best was named co-interim head coach on January 16, 2017. Four days later, Best was promoted to head coach.

Head coaching record

References

External links
 Eastern Washington profile

1978 births
Living people
American football centers
American football long snappers
Eastern Washington Eagles football coaches
Eastern Washington Eagles football players
Toronto Argonauts coaches
Players of American football from Tacoma, Washington